Sporting Clube de Mêda (abbreviated as SC Mêda) is a Portuguese football club based in Mêda in the district of Guarda.

Background
SC Mêda currently plays in the Terceira Divisão Série B which is the fourth tier of Portuguese football. The club was founded in 1946 and they play their home matches at the Estádio Dr. Augusto César de Carvalho in Mêda. The stadium is able to accommodate 3,000 spectators.

The club is affiliated to Associação de Futebol da Guarda and has competed in the AF Guarda Taça. The club has also entered the national cup competition known as Taça de Portugal on a few occasions.

Season to season

Honours
AF Guarda 1ª Divisão: 2008/09, 2010/11

Footnotes

Football clubs in Portugal
Association football clubs established in 1946
1946 establishments in Portugal